"If We Were a Season" is the first episode of the eighth season of the South Korean anthology series KBS Drama Special. Starring Chae Soo-bin, Jang Dong-yoon and Jinyoung, it aired on KBS2 on September 3, 2017.

Synopsis

Cast
Chae Soo-bin as Yoon Hae-rim 
Jang Dong-yoon as Uhm Gi-seok 
Jung Jin-young as Oh Dong-kyeong
Lee Jun-hyeok as Lee Joon-hyeok 
Jung In-gi as Yoon Gi-hyeon
Go Geon-han as Lee Jung-ho	
Ahn Seung-gyun as Seo Min-joon
 Nam Gi-ae as Kim Mi-hee

References

External links
 KBS Drama Special at KBS World
 

2017 South Korean television episodes